Claw is a 2D side-scroller platform video game published by Monolith Productions in 1997 about an anthropomorphic pirate cat who sets on a quest to find an ancient amulet while fighting enemies and solving puzzles. It is Monolith's second release after Blood, which was released that same year in May.

Plot
A famous cat pirate, Captain Nathaniel Joseph Claw, is imprisoned by the Cocker-Spaniards (a dog species, a pun on Cocker Spaniel) after they attack and sink his ship. In the prison cell, waiting for his execution, he finds a note and a piece of a map hidden in the wall. The note tells of the Amulet of Nine Lives—a mystical artifact that grants its wearer near-immortality. Breaking out of his cell, Claw sets out to collect all 9 gems of the amulet and retrieve it for himself.

The game begins with Claw outside his cell. As he progresses through the prison, he eventually gets to the outer wall and escapes to the forest after defeating the warden, Le Rauxe. In the forest, he encounters a gang of thieves, headed by his former love interest, Katherine. He manages to defeat them and finds his way out of the forest, and into the nearby port town of El Puerto del Lobo, where he is hunted down by the magistrate, Wolvington, and the city guards. After running through the city, escaping the guards, and defeating Wolvington himself, the Captain stumbles into a bar and overhears a conversation between two of the crew of Captain Red Tail, a lion who is Claw's arch enemy. He learns that Red Tail is looking for the gems of the amulet as well, and that Red Tail's first mate, Gabriel, has one of them in his possession. He also hears that Red Tail might have more himself.

Claw quickly makes his way through the port and jumps on Red Tail's ship, where he defeats the seamen (Gabriel among them) and hides in the ship until it sets port near the Pirate's Cove. Claw goes through the rickety wooden structures of the pirate cove, defeating the pirates and their leader, Marrow, Claw's former friend. Claw descends into the caves, where he discovers his old crew, presumed dead after the attack on his ship. The crew informs Claw that they were given three gems by a merchant in the tavern, but were forced to give two of them to Red Tail; they managed to keep the third as Red Tail believed there were only two in their possession. The crew then reveals that Red Tail has set sail for Tiger Island, a legendary place most doubted even existed, including Claw. Claw takes the crew's gem as well as a piece of the map, which shows a path to Tiger Island through the labyrinth of underwater caverns. The crew offers to accompany him through the caves to Tiger Island, but Claw insists on going alone, telling his crew to acquire a ship and meet him there. The Captain takes the shortcut through the caverns, where he fights through a race of merpeople, who fight him in order to defend their king: a giant frog-like creature called Aquatis. Claw manages to defeat Aquatis with explosives.

Claw resurfaces to face Red Tail and his crew on Tiger Island. Claw manages to bring Red Tail down and acquire the final two gems, yet Red Tail escapes. Claw enters the Tiger Temple at the heart of the island to claim the amulet. There he fights the highly trained tiger guards, avoids the many death traps in the lava-filled temple, and defeats Omar, the captain of the tiger guard, who holds the final gem. Claw places the gems on a pedestal, and Princess Adora appears. She gives Claw the amulet, granting him 9 lives, after summarizing his adventure. Omar is sworn to defend to the holder of the Amulet, thus becoming Claw's bodyguard. The game ends with Claw on his ship with the amulet, alongside his crew and Omar.

Gameplay

Captain Claw is a 2-D sidescrolling platformer, with simple melee combat. The objective for Claw is to reach the end of each level, fighting through various enemies and obstacles along the way. Claw's main weapon is his sword, though he can also punch or kick when close enough to an enemy. Claw also has a pistol, dynamite and a spell called "Magic Claw". These items are limited-use, and the player can refill these by collecting spare bullets, dynamite sticks and magic in levels. Also scattered throughout levels are health items, power-ups, and treasure, the last of which awards points. Many hidden or more treacherous areas contain high-value loot, power-ups and bonus lives. Some of these areas are only accessible with a high jump from a power-up, while others are only accessible through portals. Bonus lives are also awarded for reaching certain milestones in total points. In single player, each level has two save points in addition to the game saving at each level's completion.

Captain Claw has three types of gameplay modes: single player, custom levels, and multiplayer. The single player mode contains the main storyline.

At the end of each level the player will either collect a piece of the map or defeat a boss to receive a gem from the Amulet; odd-numbered levels have map pieces, while even-numbered levels have boss fights and gems. The exception is level 13, which has a boss fight and rewards the player with two gems. Receiving gems also triggers a cutscene.

The custom level loader allows the player to run custom content made by the player or others, but does not provide a method for editing levels in-game. The multiplayer mode allows the player to connect to the Internet and play with up to 64 other people. In the multiplayer mode, the player has to kill as many enemies as possible and gain loot for points to rank up. It also allows for players to race each other to finish a level as quickly as possible.

Development
Monolith Productions CEO Jason Hall intended Claw to be an entertaining and family-friendly game, saying that non-violent games were rare to find in the contemporary gaming market.

Claw was one of the first games to utilize an online multiplayer gaming network jointly created by Microsoft and the National Amusement Network, Inc. (NANI) and, according to GamePro, was originally supposed to feature 16 levels and support 256 players through the NANI network.

A special DVD edition of the game was released. The release contained extra content, such as fully animated cutscenes, and more detailed graphics. It was also included in the Creative PC DVD Encore Dxr2 set.

Reception

Claw received mixed-to-positive reviews. Allgame gave Claw a highly positive review, comparing its enjoyment value to the Super Mario and Crash Bandicoot franchises. GameSpot gave Claw a score of 7.7, stating that it is "easily the finest modern side scroller available for the PC". Colin Williamson of PC Gamer praised the graphics and 64-player mode, but criticized the game for being too similar to other side-scrollers. Craig Majaski of WorldVillage praised the game and gave it a score of 4/5. Gamasutra's Daniel Bernstein cited the game's use of sound as an example of immersive environments in gaming. PC Powerplay gave the game a mixed score of 62%; reviewer David Wildgoose criticized Monolith's decision to release a 2D platformer in the late 1990s, mentioning the contemporary release of 3D games such as Super Mario 64 and Tomb Raider, and concluded that Claw "might have been an excellent 3D platformer". Despite its success, the game is known for its high difficulty. It is considered a cult classic for its unique style, sense of adventure and beautiful graphics.

In a retrospective positive review, Anthony Burch of Destructoid wrote that Claw is "accessible" and "fun", but cited the game's high difficulty.

Legacy
Around 1999, work on a sequel to Captain Claw called Captain Claw 2 in 3D was in development by Monolith using the first incarnation of LithTech. However, due to copyright issues with the character Captain Claw, Monolith dropped the project, and passed all codes and assets of the unreleased sequel to a Polish game developer called Techland.
Techland announced that a sequel to Captain Claw was going to be released in November 2007 under the name of Captain Claw 2. The release date was delayed to 2008 and the game was renamed to Jack, the Pirate Cat. The game was later renamed to Nikita: The Mystery of the Hidden Treasure and a trailer was released on YouTube. The game was released later that year and became a stand-alone game that had nothing to do with the original game.
The engine for Claw, internally known as the Windows Animation Package 32 (after the original 16 bit Windows Animation Package first written by Brian Goble for his shareware game The Adventures of Microman), was also used by Monolith in Get Medieval and Gruntz.

References

External links

Original website (archived)

1997 video games
Fantasy video games
Monolith Productions games
Platform games
Windows games
Windows-only games
Video games about cats
Video games developed in the United States
Video games scored by Daniel Bernstein
Video games set on fictional islands
Multiplayer and single-player video games
Video games about pirates
WizardWorks games